A double salt is a salt that contains two or more different cations or anions. Examples of double salts include alums (with the general formula ) and Tutton's salts (with the general formula ). Other examples include potassium sodium tartrate, ammonium iron(II) sulfate (Mohr's salt), potassium uranyl sulfate (used to discover radioactivity) and bromlite . The fluorocarbonates contain fluoride and carbonate anions. Many coordination complexes form double salts.

Double salts should not be confused with complexes. Double salts only exist in the solid. When dissolved in water, a double salt acts as a mixture of the two separate salts: it completely dissociates into simple ions while a hexaaquo complex does not; the complex ion remains unchanged. Similarly, potassium hexaiodoytterbate(II)  is a complex salt and contains the discrete hexaiodoytterbate(II) ion , which remains intact in aqueous solutions. In many cases, the complex ion is indicated by square brackets "[ ]". Double salts are distinct from mixed-crystal systems where two salts cocrystallise; the former involves a chemical combination with fixed composition, whereas the latter is a mixture.

In general, the properties of the double salt formed will not be the same as the properties of its component single salts.

Gallery

References